Love Makes the World is the 16th studio album by Carole King, released in 2001. Distributed by Koch Records, it was her first release on her Rockingale Records label. As of 2021, it is her most recent album of new material.

During the release for the album, King appeared in a series of television advertisements for Gap, in which her daughter Louise Goffin performs "So Far Away" and King performs "Love Makes the World".

Track listing
"Love Makes the World" (Sam Hollander, Carole King, Dave Schommer) – 4:23
"You Can Do Anything" (Babyface, King, Carole Bayer Sager) – 3:58
"The Reason" (Back vocals by Celine Dion) (Mark Hudson, King, Greg Wells) – 4:39
"I Wasn't Gonna Fall in Love" (King, Sager) – 4:04
"I Don't Know" (Paul Brady, Gary Burr, Hudson, King) – 3:04
"Oh No, Not My Baby" (Gerry Goffin, King) – 3:28
"It Could Have Been Anyone" (David Foster, King, Sager) – 3:53
"Monday Without You" (Brady, Hudson, King) – 4:02
"An Uncommon Love" (Rob Hyman, King, Rich Wayland) – 3:34
"You Will Find Me There" (Joel Campbell, King) – 4:25
"Safe Again" (King) – 2:42
"This Time" (King) – 3:42

Japanese edition additional track
"Birthday Song" (King)

Deluxe edition
On May 8, 2007, a Love Makes the World: Deluxe Edition 2-disc set was released. The first disc contains all of the songs Love Makes the World does and the second disc features bonus songs and videos.

Deluxe Edition track listing
Disc 1:
"Love Makes the World" (Sam Hollander, Carole King, Dave Schommer)
"You Can Do Anything" (Babyface, King, Carole Bayer Sager)
"The Reason" (Mark Hudson, King, Greg Wells)
"I Wasn't Gonna Fall In Love" (King, Sager)
"I Don't Know" (Paul Brady, Gary Burr, Hudson, King)
"Oh No Not My Baby" (Gerry Goffin, King)
"It Could Have Been Anyone" (David Foster, King, Sager)
"Monday Without You" (Rob Hyman, King, Rich Wayland)
"An Uncommon Love"(Campbell, King)
"You Will Find Me There" (King)
"Safe Again" (King)
"This Time" (King)

Disc 2: enhanced bonus disc – audio tracks:
"Birthday Song" (King)
"Love for Christmas" (King, Sager)
"Where You Lead, I Will Follow" (King, Toni Stern)
"Lo Que Tú Eres Para Mí" (King, Alejandro Lerner)
"Two Hearts" (King, Graham Nash)

Video tracks:
"Love Makes the World" – Music Video
"Safe Again" – Music Video
Behind-the-Scenes featurette
Video Interview with Carole King

Personnel
Carole King – piano, vocals, backing vocals, vocal and string arrangements
Kenny "Babyface" Edmonds – keyboards, backing vocals, vocal arrangements, guitar, drums, programming
David Foster –  piano, keyboards
Randy Waldman – keyboards, programming
Paul Brady – piano, electric piano, backing vocals, vocal arrangement
C.J. Vanston – piano, programming, track arrangement
Steve Hamilton, Dean Parks – acoustic guitar, electric guitar
Gary Burr – acoustic guitar, backing vocals, vocal arrangement
Michael Landau, Rudy Guess – guitar, electric guitar
Rusty Anderson, Paul Jackson Jr. – electric guitar
Greg Wells – guitar, drums
Charlie Larkey – acoustic bass, bass
Nathan East, Armand Sabal-Lecco – bass
Russ Kunkel – drums
Michael Fisher, Duke Mushroom – percussion
David Boruff – saxophone
Jim Thatcher – French horn
Barbara Northcutt – oboe
David Shostac – flute
Endre Granat, Julie Ann Gigante, Jacqueline Brand, Miran Kojian, Rafael Rishik, Amy Hershberger – violin
Brian Dembow, David Walther – viola
John Walz, Armen Ksajikian – cello
Dan Woods – backing vocals
Simon Franglen, Dave Schommer, Lester Mendez – programming
Michael McCoy – drum programming
Wynton Marsalis – trumpet on "I Wasn't Gonna Fallin' Love"
Celine Dion – vocals, backing vocals on "The Reason"
k.d. lang – vocals on "An Uncommon Love"
Steven Tyler – backing vocals on "Monday Without You"
Mark Hudson – backing vocals, vocal arrangement

Notes 

2001 albums
Carole King albums
Albums produced by Babyface (musician)
E1 Music albums